Jo Ann Terry-Grissom (born August 4, 1938, in Indianapolis, Indiana) is a retired female hurdler from the United States, who represented her native country at two consecutive Summer Olympics.

Athletic career 
Terry got interested in track and field white at Crispus Attucks High School where she graduated from in 1956. in Terry was the 1960 AAU champion in both the high hurdles and the pentathlon. She attended Tennessee State University where she competed on the track team as well as the basketball team. She represented team USA in the 1960 Olympics where she finished 4th in her heat of the 80m Hurdles. Four years later she once again competed for team USA in the 1964 Olympics but this time in the Long Jump where she finished 19th in her round. In 1962, in between the olympic years, she won the 80m hurdles at the 1963 Pan American Games.

Personal life 
Terry got married in on November 23, 1963 to Leo Warner Grissom Jr.  She became a physical education instructor at various schools in the IPS system.

She is featured in the 2018 documentary Mr. Temple and the Tigerbelles which focuses on coach Ed Temple and 40 African American female athletes who helped break the color barrier in the sport.

References

 

1938 births
Living people
Track and field athletes from Indianapolis
American female hurdlers
American heptathletes
African-American female track and field athletes
Olympic track and field athletes of the United States
Athletes (track and field) at the 1960 Summer Olympics
Athletes (track and field) at the 1964 Summer Olympics
Pan American Games gold medalists for the United States
Pan American Games medalists in athletics (track and field)
Athletes (track and field) at the 1959 Pan American Games
Athletes (track and field) at the 1963 Pan American Games
Tennessee State Lady Tigers track and field athletes
Medalists at the 1963 Pan American Games
21st-century African-American people
21st-century African-American women
20th-century African-American sportspeople
20th-century African-American women
Track and field athletes from Indiana